Volodymyr Mykolayovych Pyatenko (born 9 September 1974) is a Ukrainian professional football coach and former player (defender).

Career
On 12 November 2010, Pyatenko was appointed as interim coach to the Ukrainian Premier League club FC Metalurh Donetsk after resignation Nikolay Kostov.

On 3 May 2011 he was again appointed as interim coach for Metalurh Donetsk after resignation of the next coach, Andrei Gordeyev.

In the first half of 2013 Pyatenko was appointed the head coach of FC Banants which at the end of 2012–13 season finished last in the league.

He is married and has one daughter.

Honours

Player
Ukrainian Premier League:  runner-up 1
1997
Ukrainian Cup: 1
1997

References

External links
 Profile at Official FFU Site (Ukr)

1974 births
Living people
People from Prokopyevsk
Russian emigrants to Ukraine
Ukrainian footballers
SC Tavriya Simferopol players
FC Shakhtar Donetsk players
FC Shakhtar-2 Donetsk players
FC Metalist Kharkiv players
FC Metalist-2 Kharkiv players
FC Metalurh Donetsk players
FC Metalurh-2 Donetsk players
FC Vorskla Poltava players
FC SKA-Khabarovsk players
FC Nyva Vinnytsia players
Ukrainian Premier League players
Association football defenders
Ukrainian football managers
Ukrainian expatriate footballers
Expatriate footballers in Russia
Ukrainian expatriate sportspeople in Russia
Ukrainian Premier League managers
FC Metalurh Donetsk managers
FC Urartu managers
Expatriate football managers in Armenia
Ukrainian expatriate sportspeople in Armenia
FC Krumkachy Minsk managers
Ukrainian expatriate football managers
Expatriate football managers in Belarus
Ukrainian expatriate sportspeople in Belarus
FC Obolon Kyiv managers
Ukraine under-21 international footballers
Sportspeople from Kemerovo Oblast